N. Pandurangan is an Indian politician and former Member of the Legislative Assembly of Tamil Nadu. He was elected to the Tamil Nadu legislative assembly as a Dravida Munnetra Kazhagam candidate from Peranamallur constituency in the 1996 election. Now Treasurer of the District Party.

References 

Dravida Munnetra Kazhagam politicians
Living people
Tamil Nadu MLAs 1996–2001
Year of birth missing (living people)